Willacy County is a county in the U.S. state of Texas. As of the 2020 census, its population was 20,164. Its county seat is Raymondville. The county was created in 1911 and organized the next year.

Willacy County comprises the Raymondville micropolitan statistical area, which is included in the Brownsville-Harlingen-Raymondville combined statistical area, which itself is part of the larger Rio Grande Valley region.

History
Willacy County was formed in 1911 from parts of Cameron and Hidalgo Counties, and originally included what is now Kenedy County; it was named for state senator John G. Willacy.  Kenedy was split from Willacy in 1921, when the long-settled ranchers of the northern (Kenedy) part of the county sought to separate from the newly arrived farmers of the southern part.

The Bermuda onion was introduced to Willacy County in 1912.  It grew well and slowly displaced ranchland in the southern part of the county, becoming the most important crop.  For many years, the town of Raymondville held an annual Onion Festival, using the tag line, "The Breath of a Nation".  In 1940, the first oil wells were sunk in the county's Willamar Oil Field; today, oil production is a major part of the local economy, although increasingly eclipsed by natural gas.  Also in the 1940s, sorghum was introduced to the county, gradually displacing cotton and other crops. Cattle ranching remains a substantial economic activity, as well.

In the early 2010s, wind turbines began to be built in the rural part of the county east of U.S. Highway 77, a number expanded later in 2020. The turbines became an icon to the county's identity, with their being visible from northern Cameron County and eastern Hidalgo County . Power-line infrastructure was also improved in this period.

Geography
The county borders the Gulf of Mexico.

Major highways
   Interstate 69E/U.S. Highway 77
  State Highway 186
  Farm to Market Road 498

Adjacent counties
 Kenedy County (north)
 Cameron County (south)
 Hidalgo County (west)

National protected areas
 Laguna Atascosa National Wildlife Refuge (part)
 Padre Island National Seashore (part)

Demographics

Note: the US Census treats Hispanic/Latino as an ethnic category. This table excludes Latinos from the racial categories and assigns them to a separate category. Hispanics/Latinos can be of any race.

As of the 2010 United States Census, 22,134 people, 5,764 households, and 4,607 families were living in the county. Of all households, 46.0% had children under 18 living with them, 54.5% were married couples living together, 19.3% had a female householder with no husband present, 6.1% had a male householder no wife, and 20.1% were not families. About 32.9% of all households contained an individual who was 65 years of age or older. The average household size was 3.28, and the average family size was 3.73.

Of the population, 85.8% of residents were White (10.1% non-Hispanic white), 2.1% Black or African American, 0.6% Asian, 0.3% Native American, 9.3% of some other race and 1.8% of two or more races. 87.2% of residents were Hispanic or Latino (of any race).

In the county, the age distribution was 26.8% under 18, 12.3% from 18 to 24, 27.8% from 25 to 44, 21.4% from 45 to 64, and 11.7% who were 65 or older. The median age was 32 years.

The median income for a household in the county was $22,881, and for a family was $25,399. The per capita income for the county was $10,800. 39.4% of families and 43.4% of the population were below the poverty line, including 50.5% of those under age 18 and 38.3% of those age 65 or over. The county's per-capita income makes it among the poorest counties in the United States.

Education
School districts that serve Willacy County include:
 Lasara Independent School District
 Lyford Consolidated Independent School District
 Raymondville Independent School District
 San Perlita Independent School District

In addition, residents are allowed to apply for magnet schools operated by the South Texas Independent School District.

All of the county is in the service area of Texas Southmost College.

Media
 Raymondville Chronicle & Willacy County News – Official Site
 KFRQ 94.5FM  – Official Site
 KKPS 99.5FM  – Official Site 
 KNVO 101.1FM – Official Site
 KVLY 107.9FM – Official Site

Prisons

Raymondville is the location of three private prisons, all adjacent to each other:
 the Willacy County Correctional Center (closed 2015)
 the Willacy County Regional Detention Center
 and Willacy County State Jail

Politics
Like most majority-Hispanic counties in the Rio Grande Valley, Willacy is a staunchly Democratic county. The last Republican to win the county was Richard Nixon in 1972.

Communities

Cities
 Lyford
 Raymondville (county seat)
 San Perlita

Census-designated places

 Lasara
 Los Angeles
 Port Mansfield
 Ranchette Estates
 Santa Monica
 Sebastian
 Zapata Ranch

Unincorporated community
 Lyford South

See also

 National Register of Historic Places listings in Willacy County, Texas
 Recorded Texas Historic Landmarks in Willacy County

References

External links
 .
 Historic Willacy County materials, hosted by the Portal to Texas History.
 Willacy County Profile from the Texas Association of Counties 

 
1912 establishments in Texas
Populated places established in 1912
Lower Rio Grande Valley
Majority-minority counties in Texas
Hispanic and Latino American culture in Texas